Rock Port High School is a public secondary school (grades 7–12) in Rock Port, Missouri.

District
Rock Port High School is part of the Rock Port R-II School District. Rock Port Elementary School (K-6) feeds into Rock Port High School.

Enrollment
In 2012, Rock Port had 105 students in the high school and 19 teachers.

Notable alumni
Hardin Cox,  American politician, businessman, and writer, 1945 graduate of Rock Port High School   
Zel Fischer, a current Judge on the Missouri Supreme Court, 1981 graduate of Rock Port High School

See also
 List of high schools in Missouri

References

External links
Rock Port H.S.
Rock Port R-2 School District
publicschoolreview.com

Public high schools in Missouri
Public middle schools in Missouri
Schools in Atchison County, Missouri